Neighbors from Hell is a short-lived American adult animated sitcom that ran on TBS from June 7 and ended on July 26, 2010; the first episode also aired on TBS's sister network Adult Swim on June 13 as a "sneak preview". The executive producer of the series is Pam Brady. The series' first and only season consisted of ten episodes.

It is produced by 20th Century Fox Television, Bento Box Entertainment and MoonBoy Animation, a division of DreamWorks Animation as its second and last adult animated series after Father of the Pride, The majority of the animation is produced by Bardel Entertainment in Vancouver, with retake animation work handled mostly in-house at Bento Box.

Plot 
A family of demons from Hell called the Hellmans are sent by Satan to Houston, Texas on a mission to destroy a drill that can dig to the Earth's core where Satan fears that the humans will invade Hell if the drill reaches it. The Hellmans face a culture shock trying to fit in with humans. They also realize that the humans can be as bad as the demons, and that Earth is almost no different from hell.

Characters

Main 
 Balthazor Hellman (voiced by Will Sasso) – The family's patriarch. He is a bit naive but is a very kind-hearted demon. He has a vast knowledge of human behavior from watching much human television in Hell. He almost faced punishment from Satan because of that. He is constantly trying to either get promoted or demoted at work in order to get closer to the drill, the target of which he was sent to destroy. Balthazor is shown to have an evil side too, as he almost drowned Tina's father Zebulon when he insulted his father and tried to get him fired. He appears self-conscious about being overweight as he gets offended when others make fun of it. Despite being a demon, he is overall a nice guy where he cares for his friends, such as when he covered for his friend Chevdet after getting him drunk despite it preventing him from destroying the drill, and deeply loves his family, usually ending each episode having a group hug with his family as well as state "I love you all". He has the power to breathe fire out of all his cavities such as his mouth, nostrils and once farted fire.
 Tina Hellman (voiced by Molly Shannon) – Balthazor's physically attractive and strong-willed wife and mother of Josh and Mandy. She has a short temper, is a bad driver, stubborn streak and is very protective over her family. She is an alcoholic and has an obsession with gossip as she is constantly seen with an alcoholic beverage in one hand and a gossip magazine in the other. Tina is bitter about her abrupt transition from a hardworking employee to an average housewife. She and Balthazor have a passionate and sexually charged marriage.
 Pazuzu (voiced by Patton Oswalt) – The family's helpful goblin dog that pretends to be a regular dog while on Earth. He is shown to have the ability to freeze and unfreeze time in specific situations. He is deeply fond of many pop-culture sensations which explains his love for pop stars like Lady Gaga and the Jonas Brothers. Pazuzu and Vlaartark are often found together, generally up to some sort of mischief.
 Vlaartark Mimlark (voiced by Kyle McCulloch) – The eccentric, possibly schizophrenic, uncle of Josh and Mandy. He enjoys eating cats. He also considers himself of a higher standard, judging by his voice and general knowledge. It's never stated if he's Balthazor or Tina's brother, though they both called him "uncle" as well. He also has gerontophilia.
 Mandy Hellman (voiced by Tracey Fairaway) – Balthazor and Tina's attractive yet materialistic teenage daughter who speaks with a Valley girl accent. She appears as vain, shallow and obsessed with her cell phone usually texting. She can erase people's memories from their minds. Despite shallow tendencies, she broke up with Killbride's son Wayne when he showed cruelty to disabled or unpopular kids. She is 15 years old and shown to be ambidextrous.
 Josh Hellman (voiced by David Soren) – Balthazor and Tina's preteen son. A chubby, immature and mischievous young demon boy. He has the ability to emit lasers from his eyes, can talk with animals, and has re-animation powers (only on animals thus far). He is shown to enjoy playing video games. He also likes annoying and fighting with his sister. He also had a crush on a neighborhood girl named Bethany. He is 12 years old.

Secondary 
 Don Killbride (voiced by Kurtwood Smith) – Balthazor's boss and head of Petromundo. He is very ruthless, corrupt, cynical and somewhat of a sadist. He takes a liking towards Balthazar and treats him with the littlest of respect. He is often seen with an oversize golf club. His several vices include bribery, inflicting physical harm, "dog golf", exploiting cheap labor and beating and cheating on his wives. Balthazor sees Killbride as more evil than Satan. He also has a physical attraction to Tina. Overall he is a businessman, and promotes Balthazor when he does his job well. He is a polygamist as he said he has six wives, and only two were shown.
 Marjoe Saint Sparks (voiced by Dina Waters) – The crazy, talkative, annoying and stereotypical Southern Belle next-door neighbor. She engages in bestiality with her dog Champers and annoys Tina to no end. She has a tendency to pop out at random times. Champers often tries to kill himself. She loves to chat about her sex life and family. In the first episode, she is oblivious that Tina is deliberately trying to strangle her to death.
 Chevdet Tevetoglu (voiced by Kyle McCulloch) – Chevdet is Balthazor's best friend and the chief engineer behind the drill project at Petromundo. As a recent immigrant, Chevdet works hard to make a better life for his large Turkish family. When he is not working on the drill or enduring Killbride's constant ethnic slurs, he is often hanging out with Balthazor.
Satan (voiced by Steve Coogan) – He is the one who sent the Hellmans to Earth to destroy the drill that would enable the humans to invade Hell. He seems to be fond of Tina's looks, but does not take care to Balthazor. He seems to always have a little monkey-like demon assistant on his shoulder, which is implied to be his sexual lover. Satan once called the servant "a nasty little bitch" then claiming he loves him that way. He is often sarcastic and witty, appearing at the end of each episode to inquire about the Hellman's progress toward destroying the drill. In the season finale, he finally sees Killbride, and says "Woah, that was Killbride? He is scary. Not a nice person.", hinting some fear of him. Before disappearing in a puff of smoke he usually leaves the room with the comment, "Satan, out!". He is also lactose intolerant.

Recurring 
 Champers – Marjoe's pet poodle. He is suicidal as he is forced into sexual relations with his owner. Throughout the series, he tries to kill himself in different ways, but ends up in failure due to random things (usually caused by the main characters).
 Lorelai Killbride (voiced by Mimi Rogers) – The supposed sixth wife of Don Killbride. A typical snobby trophy wife. She is shown to be as cynical and evil as Tina, with the exception of being a racist. The two become friends rather quickly, but when Lorelai sees Josh, she derides him, to Tina's disliking. She gets drunk often, and was the target of demon possession after willingly abiding by Tina's supposed want for a sexual encounter. She also once did a donkey show.
 Wayne Killbride (voiced by Eric Christian Olsen) – The 21-year-old son of Don Killbride. It is unknown whether he is also Lorelai's son or from a previous marriage. He is attractive but very immature, obnoxious and somewhat intellectually challenged as he is still in the 10th grade. Despite this, he is shown to have true feelings for Mandy as he was willing to partake in a makeover to become a "gay Mexican vampire" which is Mandy's type. He listens to alternative rock music (such as Coldplay) and Dane Cook and shops at Don Ed Hardy brand stores.

Episodes

References

External links 

 
 Behind the Scenes

2010 American television series debuts
2010 American television series endings
2010s American adult animated television series
2010s American sitcoms
American adult animated comedy television series
American adult animated horror television series
American animated sitcoms
American flash adult animated television series
Demons in television
Fiction about the Devil
English-language television shows
TBS (American TV channel) original programming
Hell in popular culture
Television series by 20th Century Fox Television
Television series by Fox Television Animation
Television series by DreamWorks Animation
Television series created by Pam Brady
Animated television series about dysfunctional families
Television shows set in Texas